Tête de la Cicle is a mountain of Savoie, France. It lies in the Beaufortain Massif range and has an elevation of 2,552 metres above sea level.

Bibliography
 Christophe Hagenmuller, Les plus belles traces du Beaufortain, Naturalpes, 2006
 Martial Manon, Panorama du Beaufortain, La Fontaine De Siloe, coll. « Les savoisiennes », 2002

Mountains of the Alps
Mountains of Savoie
Mountains of Haute-Savoie